Frederick Villiers may refer to:

Frederic Villiers (1851–1922), British war artist and correspondent
Frederick Villiers Meynell (1801–1872), British Whig politician, initially known as Frederick Villiers
Frederick Child Villiers (1815–1871), British Conservative politician